Many of the roots of the ongoing civil  conflict within Ethiopia date back to the mid-twentieth century and earlier. Following the 2018 dissolution of the ethnic federalist, dominant party political coalition, the Ethiopian People's Revolutionary Democratic Front, there was an increase in tensions within the country, with newly resurgent regional and ethnically based factions carrying out armed attacks on military and civilians in multiple conflicts throughout Ethiopia.

This tension further escalated when war broke out in the Tigray region between the federal government and the regional government in November 2020. The ENDF and Eritrean Defence Forces (EDF) entered Tigray and took the capital of Mekelle. The Tigray Defense Forces retook control of most of Tigray in mid-2021 and formed an alliance with the OLA in late 2021. The alliance declared a coalition with seven smaller rebel groups, called the United Front of Ethiopian Federalist and Confederalist Forces.

Background
Emperor Menelik II, King of Shewa, who was of mixed Amhara, Oromo, and Gurage ancestry, through his multi-ethnic Neftenya aristocratic class seized territory in 1889 that are presently known as the Oromia, Sidama and Somali Regions. The League of Nations in 1935 reported that after the invasion of Menelik's forces into non-Abyssinian lands of Somalis, Harari, Oromo, Sidama, Shanqella etc., the inhabitants were enslaved and heavily taxed by the gebbar system leading to depopulation.

During the reign of Haile Selassie and the following Derg epoch (when Ethiopia was mostly ruled by Mengistu Haile Mariam), ethnic discrimination occurred against Afars, Tigrayans, Eritreans, Somalis and Oromos. The Amhara culture dominated throughout the eras of military and monarchic rule. As a result of  settling in the southern regions, other ethnic groups assimilated into the imperial culture by adopting the Amharic language, Orthodox Christianity, and other aristocratic cultural traits found in royal court culture. Both peasant Amhara culture and Ethiopian Empire royal court culture have heavily influenced each other; the imperial culture (which influenced and was influenced by Amhara culture) dominated throughout the eras of military and monarchic rule although Siegfried Pausewang concluded in 2005 that "the term Amhara relates in contemporary Ethiopia to two different and distinct social groups. The ethnic group of the Amhara, mostly a peasant population, is different from a mixed group of urban people coming from different ethnic background, who have adopted Amharic as a common language and identify themselves as Ethiopians". Both the Haile Selassie and the Derg government relocated numerous Amharas into southern Ethiopia where they served in government administration, courts, church and in schools, where Oromo texts were eliminated and replaced by Amharic.

Following downfall of the Derg by the Ethiopian People's Revolutionary Democratic Front (EPRDF) in 1991, Ethiopia entered a short transitional government until formal government was established in 1995. The EPRDF regime notable leader Meles Zenawi appointed as a prime minister shortly after. His rule implemented ethnic federalism to the country, leading to serious ethnic clashes and persecution against Amharas, Oromos, Somalis, and other ethnic groups people, while intensifying Tigrayan nationalism and Tigrayan ethnocratic hegemony.Meles' government committed electoral fraud for over three consecutive cycles since 2000, and was considered an authoritarian regime by international observers. The EPRDF coalition leadership was ended after Prime Minister Abiy Ahmed came to power in 2018, and eventually dissolving the coalition in 2019, by merging most of its parties to multi-ethnic Prosperity Party. Notably, however, the Tigray People's Liberation Front (who had dominated the EPRDF coalition for 27 years) was not included.

Shortly after he became Prime Minister, Abiy began transforming the country's politics, releasing notable political prisoners from opposition parties. However, during his premiership, ethnic violence severely resurfaced and ethnic marginalization was more intense. By 2020, relations between the Abiy government and the now-ousted TPLF had deteriorated significantly, culminating in the start of the Tigray War in November of that year.

Pre-war events

Afar–Somali clashes 

In 2014, the federal government under the Ethiopian People's Revolutionary Democratic Front (EPRDF), redrew the boundary between the two regions of Afar Region and the Somali Region. As a result, the Afar Region gained three towns from the Somali Region which has tried to gain them back since. Border clashes in April 2021 killed around 100 civilians.

Afar Region

Amhara Region

On 10–11 January 2019, 58 Qemant people were killed by the Fano militia. The ENDF failed to intervene to stop the massacre.

On 22 June 2019 elements of The Amhara Region's Peace and Security Bureau and allied militias loyal by Brigadier General Asaminew Tsige Chief of the Amhara Region security began a coup d'état. Starting with the targeted assassinations of political and military leaders including Se'are Mekonnen (Chief of the General Staff), Gizae Aberra (Aide-de-camp to the Chief of the General Staff), and Ambachew Mekonnen (Chief Administrator of the Amhara Region). The coup d'état ultimately failed with Asaminew Tsige being killed by police near Bahir Dar 36 hours after the start of the coup.

Benishangul-Gumuz Region

Benishangul-Gumuz is home to several different ethnicities including the Gumuz, Berta, Shinasha, Mao, Komo and Fadashi. The Gumuz have had tensions with agricultural Amhara, Oromos, Tigrayans and Agaw migrants, who in Metekel Zone constitute minority ethnic groups with some Amhara groups calling for Metekel to be incorporated into Amhara. Large scale land acquisitions by both local and foreign investors have also pushed the Gumuz off the land.

Gumuz are alleged to have formed militias such as Buadin and the Gumuz Liberation Front that have staged attacks against those seen as "settlers". In the Metekel massacre in December 2020, about 200 mostly Amharas, Oromos, and Shinashas were killed by a suspected Gumuz militia. An unidentified armed group took over the county of Sedal Woreda in the Kamashi Zone of the Benishangul-Gumuz Region in April 2021.

In March 2020, the leader of one of the groups called Fano, Solomon Atanaw, stated that the Fano would not disarm until Benishangul-Gumuz Region's Metekel Zone and the Tigray Region districts of Welkait and Raya are placed under the control of Amhara Region.

Oromia Region

On 13 September 2018, clashes broke out in the town of Burayu between various ethnic groups including the Oromo, Amharas Dorzes, Gamos, Wolayitas, Gurages, and Silt'e. These clashes continued for three days leading to 55 people being killed and 670 people being injured.

After the murder of Oromo singer Hachalu Hundessa on 29 June 2020 in the Gelan Condominiums area of Addis Ababa, protests and riots broke out across Oromia. In Hachalu Hundessa home town of Ambo 83 people were killed in riots. In the town of Shashamane, dozens of buildings were destroyed and at least 150 people were killed in ethnic riots and pogroms.

On 2 November 2020, between 32 and 54 people were killed when an armed group of about 60 men suspected of being the OLA gathered 200 people in a schoolyard in the village of Gawa Qanqa before opening fire. The attacks were said to be targeted at Amhara people.

On 5 March 2021, 29 people were killed when a suspected OLA fighter attacked a church in the village of Abo. The OLA denied responsibility saying that the attack was carried out by an OLA splinter group led by Faqadaa Abdiisaa.

Oromia–Somali clashes 

Clashes between the two largest regions, the Oromia region, which constitutes primarily those of the Oromo ethnic group, and Somali region, which primarily constitutes those of the Somali ethnic group, began in December 2016 following territorial disputes. Somalis are mostly pastoralists and Oromos tend to be farmers, as well as pastoralists. It has been difficult to demarcate clear borders between the states as pastoral communities tend to cross borders in search of pasture for their animals.

This has led to competition, such as for wells and grazing land, over the years, with tens of thousands of people being displaced in some conflicts. In 2004, a referendum to decide on the fate of more than 420 kebeles, the country's smallest administrative unit, gave 80% of them to Oromia, leading to Somali minorities fleeing those areas.

By 2018, hundreds of people were killed  and 200,0000 fled their homes from the resulting conflict. The regional special police of both states, called the Liyu in the Somali region and the Liyu Hail of Oromia state, were both accused of committing atrocities.

Somali Region 
With the succession of Abiy Ahmed to the position of Prime Minister friction began to build between the federal government and Somali regional governments due to Ahmed's reformist vision which clashed with Abdi Mohamed Omar (Abdi Illey) who had ruled over the region with an iron fist for the past 8 years. Despite attempts to negotiate a path forward, the tension between the two men would boil over, when in late July 2018, Abdi Illey ordered the Liyu police to enter into Dire Dawa, an area of Ethiopia outside of the Somali region’s jurisdiction. The Liyu police, up to this point, had mainly been a counterinsurgency force created by the federal government in 2007 to help fight the Ogaden National Liberation Front and were commanded by then Somali regional security chief Abdi Mohammed Omar who would later become the region's president in 2010. Although he was no longer the region's security chief, the Liyu would still continue to report to him. In repose to the "illegal act," federal forces confronted the Liyu and entered Jijiga on August 4.

Southern Nations, Nationalities, and Peoples' Region

Bench Maji Zone
In the Guraferda woreda of the Bench Maji Zone in the SNNPR in October 2020, about 30 people were killed by an unidentified armed group. The victims were said to have been Amhara.

Gedeo Zone

In 2018, clashes began between the Gedeo Zone in the Southern Nations, Nationalities, and Peoples' Region (SNNPR), made up of mostly Gedeo people, and the Guji Zone in the Oromia region, made up of mostly Guji Oromos. The clashes led to about 800,000 mostly ethnic Gedeos fleeing their homes. This was a higher number of people and over a shorter period of time than occurred at the height of the more publicized Rohingya crisis in Myanmar the year before. The government pressured the refugees to return to their homes even though they fear for their lives, often by denying refugees access to humanitarian aid.

Konso Zone

Amaro-Guji

The Segen Area Peoples' Zone, formerly a zone in the SNNPR, split in 2018 to form the Konso Zone, inhabited mostly by Konso people, as well as the Burji special woreda, Dirashe special woreda and Amaro special woreda and there has been intermittent violence since then. Violence in the latter half of 2020 attributed to Oromo and Konso communities killed dozens of civilians and displaced at least 90,000 people.

Sidama

The Sidama Zone was previously part of the SNNPR and the Sidama people were the largest ethnic group in that region. In July 2019, clashes between groups on the issue of greater autonomy for Sidama led to deaths and internal displacement. A vote in favor of greater autonomy in the 2019 Sidama Region referendum resulted in Sidama Zone becoming the country's 10th region. A number of other ethnic groups in the region are also pursuing demands to form their ethnic-based state.

Wolayita Zone
In the Wolayita Zone, at least 17 people were killed in August 2020 by security forces. This was following calls for making a separate region for the Welayta people in the same fashion as the Sidama region for the Sidama people.

Course of the war

Tigray Region

The Tigray Regional Government was led by the Tigray People's Liberation Front (TPLF), which formerly dominated the Ethiopian People's Revolutionary Democratic Front coalition. Hostilities between the central government and the TPLF escalated after the TPLF rejected the federal government's decision to postponing August 2020 elections to mid-2021 as a result of the COVID-19 pandemic, accusing the government of violating the Ethiopian constitution.

The TPLF carried out its own regional elections, winning all contested seats in the region's parliament.  In the months before November 2020, Mr. Abiy moved troops toward Tigray and sent military cargo planes into Eritrea. Behind closed doors, his advisers and military generals debated the merits of a conflict. Those who disagreed were fired, interrogated at gunpoint or forced to leave.

By 31 October, the TDF had claimed to have taken the strategically located city of Kombolcha, 380 kilometres from Addis Ababa, as well as the nearby city of Dessie. The government denied the claims, reporting that fighting was still going on in and around the two cities. The Ethiopian government further claimed that as the TDF entered Kombolcha, they massacred more than 100 youths. TPLF spokesperson Getachew Reda denied the claim.

After attacks on the Northern Command by armed forces loyal to the TPLF, which the TPLF called a pre-emptive strike, the Ethiopian National Defense Force (ENDF) launched an offensive, capturing Mekelle, the capital of Tigray in November 2020. The ENDF was assisted by forces from neighboring Eritrea.

Amhara Region

Throughout much of Western Tigray, security is mostly maintained by uniformed "special forces" from neighboring Amhara states and civil servants have also arrived from Amhara to take over the administration of some Tigrayan towns and cities, a move that risks inflaming ethnic tensions. On 18 December 2020, looting was reported by EEPA, including 500 dairy cows and hundreds of calves stolen by Amhara forces.

On 23 November 2020, a reporter of AFP news agency visited the western Tigray town of Humera, and observed that the administration of the conquered parts of Western Tigray was taken over by officials from Amhara region. As of 1 March 2021, several geographical places had been renamed by the new authorities and many residents of Tigrayan ethnicity had been deported to Central Zone. Eyewitnesses report ongoing ethnic cleansing and settlements void of inhabitants.

The Humera massacres in 2020 that killed around 92 people of Tigrayan origin was attributed to Fano and ENDF. The Humera massacres in 2021 that killed Tigrayans were also attributed to Fano and possibly Eritrean soldiers. Fano are also accused of participating in the Mai Kadra massacre, which had both Amhara and Tigrayan victims, while Amnesty International, the Ethiopian Human Rights Commission, and the Ethiopian Human Rights Council attributed it to local Tigrayan youths.

Starting in March 2021 clashes erupted in the town of Ataye after Amhara special forces killed a person on the steps of the main mosque in the city. This started off a wave of inter ethnic clashes that spread throughout the Oromia Zone leading to the deaths of 303 people. On 16 April Clashes once again started after OLA fighters attacked the city of Ataye, The clashes continued for two days leading to the deaths of 281 people and the destruction of a quarter of Ataye.

By November 2021, fighting in the Tigray War had moved south of Tigray Region into Amhara Region, leading to a joint military campaign by the Tigray Defense Forces (TDF) and the Oromo Liberation Army (OLA) against federal forces, threatening Addis Ababa, the capital of Ethiopia.

The killings continued through 2021, with people being tortured, tied up and thrown in the Tekeze River. The Italian weekly magazine Panorama published a graphic video in which Amhara soldiers killed a group of 9 people in Humera in August 2021 and then put their bodies on fire. The video also shows torturing of one man by Amhara soldiers, then tying him up, preparing to throw him in the river.

Oromia region

On 5 November 2021, the Tigray Defense Forces and Oromo Liberation Army joined with other armed and opposition groups in declaring an alliance against the government known as the United Front of Ethiopian Federalist and Confederalist Forces. The alliance includes the Afar Revolutionary Democratic Unity Front, Agaw Democratic Movement, Benishangul People's Liberation Movement, Gambella Peoples Liberation Army, Global Kimant People Right and Justice Movement/Kimant Democratic Party, Sidama National Liberation Front and the Somali State Resistance. They further pledged to dismantle the government of Prime Minister Abiy, by force if necessary, and form a transitional government. But analysts state that most of the groups “do not have a strong fighting force,” and some of the political groups “have even weaker political programs.” thus making their impact unclear.

Between 30–31 August 2022, eyewitnesses said that militants from the Amhara Region (whom they claimed were Fano militias) massacred more than 60 people in Horo Guduru, Western Oromia, and displaced 20,000 more. On 6 September, the Ethiopian Human Rights Commission (EHRC) confirmed this attack happened, though they declined to say whether the attackers were part of Fano.

The administrator of Kiramu district in the East Welega Zone, Fikadu Hunde, alleged that on 15 October 2022, Fano militias entered the district, killing 30 people and burning down over 50 houses. The EHRC learned of this information, but stated that there "was difficulty in verifying and obtaining accurate information due to the lack of network in the area," according to a statement they made to Addis Standard.

Somali Region

In November 2021, the Somali State Resistance allied with the Tigray People's Liberation Front and UFEFCF.

In July 2022, the Islamist militant group al-Shabaab launched an invasion from Somalia into Ethiopia's Somali Region; the invasion was the largest attack by al-Shabaab in Ethiopian territory to date.

Further reading

 Verhoeven, Harry; Woldemariam, Michael (2022). "Who lost Ethiopia? The unmaking of an African anchor state and U.S. foreign policy". Contemporary Security Policy.

References

 
2018 in Ethiopia
2019 in Ethiopia
2020 in Ethiopia
2021 in Ethiopia
2022 in Ethiopia
2010s civil wars
2020s civil wars
Civil wars involving the states and peoples of Africa
Civil wars post-1945
Conflicts in 2018
Conflicts in 2019
Conflicts in 2020
Conflicts in 2021
Conflicts in 2022
Ethnicity-based civil wars
Proxy wars
Rebellions in Ethiopia
Riots and civil disorder in Ethiopia
Wars involving Eritrea
Wars involving Ethiopia
Wars involving Sudan